Muthal Vasantham is a 1986 Indian Tamil-language masala film, directed by Manivannan and produced by P. Kalaimani, who also wrote the film's story. It stars Pandiyan, Chandrasekar, Ramya Krishnan and Mahalakshmi. The film, released on 22 May 1986, was remade in Telugu as Asthulu Anthasthulu (1988) and in Hindi by Manivannan as Hum Bhi Insaan Hain (1989).

Plot 

The rivalry between Kunguma Pottu Gounder and Vettaikkara Gounder splits a village into two. A villager who runs a boat, always fights against their dictatorship and tries to protect the villagers. An innocent orphan enters the village and becomes a man servant in Vettaikkara Gounder's house. Vettaikkara Gounder's only daughter falls for him. Vettaikkara Gounder learns it, becomes furious and whips him. With the help of the boatman, the lovers elope. But they get caught, and Vettaikkara Gounder extracts vengeance by severing the boatman's arms. He also accuses his man servant of abduction and attempted rape.

In the court, Vettaikkara Gounder's daughter lies under oath that the man servant is guilty of the accusations made by her father. After having served his term in jail, the man servant returns to the village seeking vengeance. At the same time, he is confronted by Vettaikkara Gounder's rival Kunguma Pottu Gounder. Will Kunguma Pottu Gounder use the man servant to settle his rivalry against Vettaikkara Gounder? Will the lovers unite?

Cast 

Pandiyan
Chandrasekar
Ramya Krishnan
Mahalakshmi
Vinu Chakravarthy
Malaysia Vasudevan as Vettaikkara Gounder
Vennira Aadai Moorthy
Y. Vijaya
Chinni Jayanth
Peeli Sivam
Typist Gopu
Sathyaraj as Kunguma Pottu Gounder

Production 
P. Kalaimani approached Manobala to direct Muthal Vasantham; however the partners of Kalaimani were uninterested in having Manobala as director and replaced him with Manivannan. While filming the song "Aarum Athu Aalam Illai", Ramya Krishnan stood without moving much because her right leg had been fractured shortly before. During the completion, Pandiyan's market was allegedly dull, so Kalaimani changed the climax to show Sathyaraj as hero.

Soundtrack 
The music was composed by Ilaiyaraaja. The song is "Aarum Athu Aalam Illai" set in the Carnatic raga Vakulabharanam.

Release and reception 
Muthal Vasantham was released on 22 May 1986. Jayamanmadhan of Kalki noted that, despite infusing masala into a love story, the makers did a good execution of the story. The film ran for over 25 weeks in theatres.

References

External links 
 

1980s masala films
1980s Tamil-language films
1986 films
Films directed by Manivannan
Films scored by Ilaiyaraaja
Tamil films remade in other languages